D'Orbigny's slider or the black-bellied slider (Trachemys dorbigni), commonly known in Brazil as tartaruga-tigre or tartaruga-tigre-d'água (which mean "tiger turtle" and "water tiger turtle" in Portuguese), is a species of water turtle in the family Emydidae. The species is found in southern Brazil, northeastern Argentina, and Uruguay. Two subspecies (in addition to the nominate subspecies) are recognized as being valid, Trachemys dorbigni adiutrix and Trachemys dorbigni brasiliensis.

Etymology
The specific name, dorbigni, is in honor of French naturalist Alcide d'Orbigny.

Description
The form of the plastron determines its gender. After a few years of life, show differences between male and female. Males have a penis that is inserted into the tail. It becomes apparent only during the mating season when it is inserted into the female's cloaca. D'Orbigny's slider  has a life span between 30 to 100 years in captivity.

They are usually found in water bodies such as lakes, marshes, streams and rivers. They have a preference for waters with low or moderate currents, soft bottoms and abundant aquatic vegetation.

Babies are born weighing  with a  carapace. When the males reach sexual maturity (after 2 years), they acquire a dark color while the females keep the same green after maturity (at 5 years).

Sexual dimorphism 
The sex identification is only possible when adult, at 5 or 6 years. The female is bigger and may reach  in length and has the bottom of the shell (plastron) slightly convex so as to provide more space for eggs. The male reaches to and has a longer and bulky tail, furthermore, the male bottom of the shell is straight or slightly concave to fit better upon females.

The male's cloaca is located 2/3 the distance between the tail beginning and the shell, while the female is very close to the shell.

Reproduction 
Females produce an average of 10 eggs per buried nest; usually they bury two nests per season. Incubation ranges from 2 to 4 months. The eggs are white-colored.

Only 31% of the female population lays egg each year.

The sex of baby turtles is determined by the temperature of the sand during incubation, lower temperatures increase the number of females.

Diseases 

The turtles are susceptible to diseases such as pneumonia, dystocia, bone decalcification, vitamin deficiency, gastroenteritis, and prolapses.

Pet owners must avoid using small objects as decoration in their tank, because they tend to eat everything they can. Such small objects, such as pebbles and plastic decorations, may lead to gut impaction, which is very likely to require surgical intervention.

Despite being very hardy, they may have rachitis, a disease that makes the shell soft due to protein deficiency. It may be corrected by adding protein to meals, especially through fish.

Placing turtles in abrasive surfaces can also cause plastron injuries, which provide an entrance point to fungi and bacteria.

Allowing the animal to maintain its temperature around an optimal point (between 28 and 34 degrees Celsius) is a necessity. Providing the turtles with daily sun light or special UV light so that they can properly metabolize vitamin D will avoid metabolic issues.

Diet
These omnivorous turtles can eat almost anything in nature shrimps, vegetables, fruit, carrion, small fishes, snails, worms, etc.

During the first two years of life these turtles are mainly carnivorous, eating small animals and carrion, but then they switch to being mainly vegetarian eating more vegetables and algae then meat.

Diet in captivity
For pet keepers it is recommended that you feed them more than once every day in the first two-years, then shift to feeding once every two days.

Protection

Brazil
This species can be owned only with specific documentation. The purchase invoice must contain the popular and scientific name, and designate the number of animals. Also required is a certificate of origin, invoice number and the number of commercial breeding of wildlife as recorded in the Brazilian IBAMA.

It is forbidden to release the animals in nature and is subject to the penalties provided in the law No.  6.938/81 and No. 9.605/98.

If the owner can no longer keep it, the store that made the sale is obliged to take the animal back, the animal will be shipped back to the only farm allowed to breed them in Brazil.

Uruguay 
In Uruguay turtles can only be owned with specific documentation and as they are a protected species commercialization is forbidden.

References

Bibliography

Trachemys
Turtles of South America
Reptiles of Brazil
Reptiles of Argentina
Reptiles of Uruguay
Reptiles described in 1835
Taxa named by André Marie Constant Duméril
Taxa named by Gabriel Bibron